The William Wyse Professorship of Social Anthropology is a professorship in social anthropology at the University of Cambridge. It was founded on 18 June 1932 and endowed partly with the support of Trinity College from money bequeathed to them by William Wyse, formerly Fellow and Honorary Fellow of Trinity. 

The professorship is assigned to the Faculty of Archaeology and Anthropology.

List of William Wyse Professors of Social Anthropology
 1932–1937 – Thomas Callan Hodson
 1937–1950 – John Henry Hutton
 1950–1973 – Meyer Fortes
 1973–1984 – Jack Goody
 1984–1992 – Ernest André Gellner
 1993–2008 – Marilyn Strathern
 2008–2014 – Henrietta Moore
 since 2016 – James Laidlaw

References 

Social Anthropology, William Wyse
Faculty of Human, Social, and Political Science, University of Cambridge
Social Anthropology, William Wyse, Cambridge
1932 establishments in England